The 62nd Directors Guild of America Awards, honoring the outstanding directorial achievements in films, documentary and television in 2009, were presented on January 30, 2010 at the Hyatt Regency Century Plaza. The ceremony was hosted by Carl Reiner. The nominees for the feature film category were announced on January 7, 2010, the nominations for the television and commercial categories were announced on January 8, 2010, and the nominees for documentary directing were announced on January 12, 2010.

Winners and nominees

Film

Television

Commercials

Lifetime Achievement in Feature Film
 Norman Jewison

Lifetime Achievement in News Direction
 Roger Goodman

Frank Capra Achievement Award
 Cleve Landsberg

Franklin J. Schaffner Achievement Award
 Maria Jimenez Henley

Honorary Life Member
 Bob Iger
 Barry Meyer

References

External links
  

Directors Guild of America Awards
2009 film awards
2009 guild awards
2009 television awards
Direct
Direct
2009 awards in the United States